Chief Iheme of Isi-Akpu Nise near Awka was a chief apprentice of Maazi Izuogu Mgbokpo. He helped defeat the Ikpa Ora people and was one of the founding fathers of Arondizuogu. His people later migrated to the kingdom.

References 
https://web.archive.org/web/20060429055818/http://frasouzu.com/Seminar%20Papers/Ambience.htm cf. Asouzu, Innocent I. (2004), The Method and Principles of Complementary in and beyond African Philosophy, Calabar University Press; Asouzu, Innocent I. (2005), The Method and Principles of Complementary Reflection in and beyond African Philosophy, Lit Publishers, Münster, 2005. 

http://www.nigerdeltacongress.com/iarticles/ibiniukpabi.htm

Aro people